Mogodé is a commune in Mayo-Tsanaga Department, Cameroon. In 2005, the population was recorded at 112905.

Gallery

References 

Communes of Far North Region (Cameroon)